Antônio Sarto (February 27, 1926 – September 29, 2008) was the Brazilian bishop of the Roman Catholic Diocese of Barra do Garças from his appointment on March 25, 1982, by Pope John Paul II until his retirement on May 23, 2001. He remained Bishop Emeritus of Barra do Garças until his death on September 29, 2008, at the age of 82.

References and external links 
 Catholic Hierarchy: Bishop Antônio Sarto, S.D.B. †

1926 births
2008 deaths
People from Mato Grosso
20th-century Roman Catholic bishops in Brazil
Roman Catholic bishops of Porto Velho
Roman Catholic bishops of Barra do Garças